Artigliere has been the name of at least five ships of the Italian Navy and may refer to:

 , a  launched in 1907 and discarded in 1923.
 , a  launched in 1937 and lost in 1940.
 , a  launched in 1937 as Camicia Nera and renamed in 1943. She was transferred to Russia in 1949 under the designation Z 12. She was stricken about 1958.
 , a  launched in 1941 as USS Woodworth She was transferred to Italy in 1951 and struck in 1971.
 , a  launched in 1983 as Hittin for Iraq. Seized by Italy in 1993 and renamed Artigliere.

Italian Navy ship names